is a JR West Geibi Line station located in Kamikawatachi-chō, Miyoshi, Hiroshima Prefecture, Japan.

History
1915-04-28: Kawatachi Station opens
1937-07-01: The station name is changed to Kamikawatachi Station
1987-04-01: Japan National Railways is privatized, and Kamikawatachi Station becomes a JR West station

Station building and platforms
Kamikawatachi Station features one raised, station-side platform, capable of handling one line. The station was formerly a switching station, and some of the old facilities can still be seen there. The station building is operated as part of an agricultural cooperative building which includes a supermarket.

Environs
Kawatachi Branch Post Office
Miyoshi Municipal Kawachi Junior High School
Gōno River

Highway access
Japan National Route 54
 Hiroshima Prefectural Route 37 (Hiroshima-Miyoshi Route)

Connecting lines
All lines are JR West lines. 
Geibi Line
Shiwachi Station — Kamikawatachi Station — Kōtachi Station

External links
 JR West

Geibi Line
Railway stations in Hiroshima Prefecture
Railway stations in Japan opened in 1915